Artmanja Vas ( or) is a small village southeast of Dobrnič in the Municipality of Trebnje in eastern Slovenia. The area is part of the historical Lower Carniola region. The municipality is now included in the Southeast Slovenia Statistical Region.

Name
Artmanja Vas was attested in historical sources as Herttendorf in 1250, Armansdorf in 1261, Hartmansdorff in 1354, and Artmansdarff in 1463, among other spellings.

Climate
The local climate is warm, with an average temperature of 10.9 °C and an average rainfall of 1,220 mm.

References

External links
Artmanja Vas at Geopedia

Populated places in the Municipality of Trebnje